Choyrodon (meaning "Choir tooth" after where it was first discovered) is a genus of hadrosauroid dinosaur from the Early Cretaceous Albian-age Khuren Dukh Formation of Mongolia. The type and only species is Choyrodon barsboldi. The generic name is derived from the city of Choyr, and -odon, from Greek for tooth; the specific name barsboldi honours paleontologist Rinchen Barsbold. The material consists of a holotype partial skull and cervical ribs, with two other partial skulls both with associated postcranial material. It was found to be the sister taxon of Eolambia.

Three specimens are known: MPC-D 100/801 (the holotype), MPC-D 100/800 and MPC-D 100/803.

See also
 2018 in paleontology
 Timeline of hadrosaur research

References

Fossil taxa described in 2018
Iguanodonts
Early Cretaceous dinosaurs of Asia
Ornithischian genera